Fleisch (international title: Spare Parts) is a German television horror film directed by . Released in 1979, the film focuses on organ trafficking. Fleisch has been recognized as a cult film.

Plot
A newly married couple is spending their honeymoon in the southwestern United States. Suddenly, the unbelievable happens: the husband is kidnapped and assaulted by paramedics in an ambulance. The wife escapes at the last minute, and is picked up by a truck driver. Together they embark on the search for the kidnapped husband, they encounter a dangerous and perfectly organized syndicate that supplies the world's wealthy customers in organs of young, healthy people.

Cast
 Jutta Speidel - Monica
 Wolf Roth - Bill
  - Mike
 Charlotte Kerr - Dr. Jackson

Production
It was produced for ZDF and was telecasted on the 16 June 1979 on German television, the cast of the film includes Jutta Speidel and Wolf Roth.

Remake
The television station ProSieben narrated the 2008 remake of the film, which was directed by Oliver Schmitz, the movie starred Sebastian Ströbel and Theresa Scholze.

Books
Erler has the screenplay of Fleisch processed in a novel, which originally released from Goldmann Verlag, the Shayol Verlag released in 2006, a new revised edition.

References

External links

1979 films
1979 horror films
1979 television films
1970s thriller films
Films about organ trafficking
Films set in West Germany
Films set in New Mexico
Films set in New York (state)
1970s German-language films
German-language television shows
German television films
German thriller films
West German films
1970s German films
ZDF original programming